The Sunningdale Foursomes is an open foursomes golf tournament contested at the Sunningdale Golf Club, Berkshire in March. It was first contested in 1934 and has been held annually since, except between 1940 and 1947. The event is open to all golfers. Players are handicapped based only on whether they are male or female, professional or amateur.

Format
The event is played over four days each March at Sunningdale Golf Club and is open to all golfers. Any combination of male or female, professional or amateur, is allowed. The format is foursomes match play, the field being limited to 128 pairs. For the first two rounds both the Old and New courses are used, but thereafter only the Old course is used. Players are handicapped based solely on whether they are male or female, professional or amateur.

Handicaps
The handicaps have varied slightly over the years. The current handicaps are:

Male professionals: +1
Male amateurs: 0
Female professionals: 2
Female amateurs: 3

Before 2023 female amateurs received a handicap of 4,

All competitors play from the same tees. Currently pairs receive the full difference of the combined handicaps, so that two female amateurs will receive 8 strokes from two male professionals.

Winners

Source:

References

Golf tournaments in England
Sport in Berkshire
Recurring sporting events established in 1934
1934 establishments in England